

479001–479100 

|-bgcolor=#f2f2f2
| colspan=4 align=center | 
|}

479101–479200 

|-bgcolor=#f2f2f2
| colspan=4 align=center | 
|}

479201–479300 

|-bgcolor=#f2f2f2
| colspan=4 align=center | 
|}

479301–479400 

|-bgcolor=#f2f2f2
| colspan=4 align=center | 
|}

479401–479500 

|-bgcolor=#f2f2f2
| colspan=4 align=center | 
|}

479501–479600 

|-id=553
| 479553 Garyzema ||  || Gary Gene Zema (1953–2019) was an American musician and computer programmer from Belle Vernon, Pennsylvania. He played tuba and baritone horn, and was a singer and band leader in On The Lam, Zlatne Uste and Cornerstone Chorale. A lifelong hiker, his namesake will ramble boundlessly through the asteroid belt. || 
|}

479601–479700 

|-bgcolor=#f2f2f2
| colspan=4 align=center | 
|}

479701–479800 

|-bgcolor=#f2f2f2
| colspan=4 align=center | 
|}

479801–479900 

|-bgcolor=#f2f2f2
| colspan=4 align=center | 
|}

479901–480000 

|-bgcolor=#f2f2f2
| colspan=4 align=center | 
|}

References 

479001-480000